Sir John Reynwell (also spelt Rainwell; died 1445) was Lord Mayor of London.

Career
Reynwell was a City of London fishmonger. He prospered in his trade, became a Sheriff of London in 1412, Lord Mayor of London in 1426–27 and was knighted. In 1427 he started work on a new gate and drawbridge in an undocumented part of the city. He was Member of Parliament for the City of London in 1410, 1415, 1433 and 1445 as one of the two aldermanic representatives.

Coat of arms
Reynwell's arms were a chevron between three dolphins embowed. This design reflected the arms of the ancient Guild of Fishmongers, similar to those of the present Worshipful Company of Fishmongers (see that article - and whoever originally entered this text used the name of Askham, another Lord Mayor, not Reynwell, so this may be in error).

See also
List of Sheriffs of London
List of Lord Mayors of London
 City of London (elections to the Parliament of England)

Sources

Further reading

External links
Sir John Rainwell at Heraldsnet.org (see entry for dolphin)
Fishmongers' Hall and Fish Street Hill

Sheriffs of the City of London
Knights Bachelor
Members of the Parliament of England for the City of London
1445 deaths
Year of birth unknown
15th-century lord mayors of London
English MPs 1410
English MPs 1415
English MPs 1433
English MPs 1445
Fishmongers (people)